Elections to Stafford Borough Council were held on 5 May 2011. All 59 seats on the council were up for election. There were elections held in 26 wards. The Conservative Party retained majority control of the council. Overall turnout was 45.93%, with the lowest turnout (31.1%) in Coton ward and the highest (54.7%) in Chartley.

Election result

|}

The total number of seats on the Council after the election was:
Conservative Party - 38
Labour - 17
Liberal Democrats - 2
Green Party - 1
Independent - 1

Sources:  
Stafford Borough Council

Results by ward
All results from Stafford Borough Council.

Barlaston and Oulton (2 seats)

Baswich (2 seats)

Chartley (1 seat)

Church Eaton (1 seat)

Common (2 seats)

Coton (2 seats)

Eccleshall (3 seats)

Forebridge (2 seats)

Fulford (3 seats)

Gnosall and Woodseaves (3 seats)

Haywood and Hixon (3 seats)

Highfields and Western Downs (3 seats)

Holmcroft (3 seats)

Littleworth (3 seats)

Manor (3 seats)

Milford (2 seat)

Milwich (1 seat)

Penkside (2 seats)

Rowley (2 seats)

Seighford (2 seats)

St Michael's (2 seats)

Stonefield and Christchurch (2 seats)

Swynnerton (2 seats)

Tillington (2 seats)

Walton (3 seats)

Weeping Cross (3 seats)

2011 English local elections
2011
2010s in Staffordshire